In most U.S. states, intercity passenger train service is provided solely by Amtrak (the National Railroad Passenger Corporation), with no assistance of any sort from state or local governments. This level of service usually includes only a few long distance trains such as the Coast Starlight or California Zephyr, with perhaps a small number of shorter distance trains operating within the state. This was the situation in California prior to 1976. Since 1976, California has been one of several states which assists Amtrak in order to provide more service than the basic system.

Through Caltrans, the state government of California provides capital grants and support for station and track improvements (including signaling), locomotives and cars, connecting Amtrak bus service, and operating assistance for three corridors: the Pacific Surfliner, the San Joaquins and the Capitol Corridor.

Stations
This is the list of 74 active Amtrak stations in California. This list does not include stations that are served only by Amtrak Thruway Motorcoach and not Amtrak trains.

Planned
These stations are planned or currently under construction:

Former

See also 
 Amtrak California
 List of Amtrak stations national list

Notes

References

External links

 

 
Amtrak